The Clarke Street Meeting House (also known as the Second Congregational Church Newport County or Central Baptist Church) is an historic former meeting house and Reformed Christian church building at 13-17 Clarke Street in Newport, Rhode Island. Built in 1735, the structure is listed on the National Register of Historic Places.

History 
The meeting house was built in 1735 and served as a worship place for the Second Congregational Church, originally a Calvinist congregation. From 1755 to 1786, Ezra Stiles, a well-known minister who later became president of Yale University, pastored the church and lived in the Ezra Stiles House across the street. During the American Revolutionary War, British forces occupied the meeting house and minister's house for use as a barracks and hospital from 1776 to 1779. After the war, a committee of Second Church members, including William Ellery, Henry Marchant, Robert Stevens and William Channing wrote to John Adams in Europe requesting that he contact Reformed congregations there for assistance in repairing the church due to the British army's damage to the building. Adams responded that he would be unable to help because of differences in European attitudes toward soliciting for funds. Regardless of the difficulties, the building was extensively repaired in 1785.

The congregation later left the building and merged with Newport's First Congregational Church to become United Congregational Church to which the building was sold in 1835. In 1847 the Central Baptist Society, which broke off from the Second Baptist Church in Newport, purchased and extensively modified the building. The Central Baptist Church later reunited with the Second Baptist Church and then in the 1940s reunited with the First Baptist Church in Newport to form the United Baptist Church. The church's original steeple blew down in the 1938 hurricane.

In 1950 St. Joseph's Church of Newport purchased the meeting house and further renovated the structure.  The Clarke Street Meeting House was added to the National Register of Historic Places in 1971. Around the 1980s the structure was converted into condominiums.

Notable congregants 
William Vernon, merchant
Henry Marchant, U.S. District Judge
William Ellery, signer of Declaration of Independence

Gallery

See also 

United Congregational Church (disambiguation)
National Register of Historic Places listings in Newport County, Rhode Island

References 

Churches completed in 1735
Churches on the National Register of Historic Places in Rhode Island
United Church of Christ churches in Rhode Island
Churches in Newport, Rhode Island
National Register of Historic Places in Newport, Rhode Island
18th-century churches in the United States
Historic district contributing properties in Rhode Island